Plummer Roddis was a chain of department store based in the South of England which was acquired by Debenhams.

History
Plummer Roddis started out as separate companies in the 19th Century. William Plummer started out as a draper in Hastings and in 1871 had a store at 3 Robertson Street, before opening another store in Southampton on the corner of Above Bar and Commercial Street. George Roddis in 1870 was listed as a draper in Market Harborough, but by 1881 was a partner in a drapers & milliners called Roddis & Goldsmith at 1-2 Robertson Street, Hastings.

In the late 19th Century William Plummer, George Roddis and Reginald Tyrrell, a Bournemouth draper, joined forces to create Plummer, Roddis and Tyrrell but in 1898 Reginald Tyrrell relinquished his partnership to concentrate on his other business Tyrrell & Green and the business became Plummer Roddis.

The business continued to grow opening branches in Boscombe, Brighton, Bath, Eastbourne, Folkestone, Andover Weymouth, and Yeovil (formerly Fred Taylor). The business was celebrated by being mentioned in H. G. Wells book Kipps: The Story of a Simple Soul.

In 1927 the Hastings store was rebuilt by renowned architect Henry Ward (he also designed the additions to the Brighton store), while the Southampton store and Bournemouth store were extensively rebuilt, the last work before World War II being completed at Bournemouth to the designs of the architect Jonathan Makepeace in 1938. The head office of the Plummer Roddis group was based in Sillwood Road, Brighton.

During the Second World War the Southampton store was destroyed by German bombing, and operated out of different locations across the city until a new store was completed in 1965. However, by this time Plummer Roddis had been bought by Debenhams, who invested in a new branch to be built in Guildford, which opened in 1968.

In the early 1970s the stores were rebranded as Debenhams, except for the Southampton store. In 1972 the Bournemouth store was re-opened as a Debenhams by Terry Wogan, but for the store to be closed down a year later when Debenhams rebranded the Bobby & Co. store in the town. The Boscombe branch had been closed the previous year. By 2014 the only Plummer Roddis stores that operated as Debenhams still open were Guildford and Hastings.

The Southampton store continued to operate under the Plummer Roddis name after a management buyout, but closed on 14 August 1993, when the store closed. The store is now home to a teaching centre for Southampton Solent University.

References

Defunct department stores of the United Kingdom
Defunct retail companies of the United Kingdom
Retail companies established in 1898
Debenhams
Southampton
Bournemouth
Hastings
Brighton
Retail companies disestablished in 1993
1898 establishments in England
1993 disestablishments in England